Anastasia Pastourmatzi (born 4 May 1977) is a road cyclist from Greece. She represented her nation at the 2007 UCI Road World Championships.

References

External links
 profile at Procyclingstats.com

1977 births
Greek female cyclists
Living people
Place of birth missing (living people)